Achter is a surname. Notable people with the surname include:

A. J. Achter (born 1988), American baseball player and coach
Rod Achter (born 1961), American football player